Michele Lupo (4 December 1932 – 27 June 1989) was an Italian film director. He directed 23 films between 1962 and 1982. He was born in Corleone, Italy, and died in Rome, Italy.

Selected filmography

 Colossus of the Arena (1962)
 Seven Slaves Against the World (1964)
 Seven Rebel Gladiators (1965)
 The Revenge of Spartacus (1965)
 Arizona Colt (1966)
 Master Stroke (1967)
 Seven Times Seven (1968)
 Your Turn to Die (1969)
 Una storia d'amore (Love Me, Baby, Love Me!) (1969)
 The Weekend Murders (1970)
 Stanza 17-17 palazzo delle tasse, ufficio imposte (1971)
 The Master Touch (1972)
 Ben and Charlie (1972)
 Mean Frank and Crazy Tony (1973)
 Africa Express (1975)
 California (1977)
 Lo chiamavano Bulldozer (1978)
 The Sheriff and the Satellite Kid (1979)
 Everything Happens to Me (1980)
 Buddy Goes West (1981)
 Bomber (1982)

References

External links

1932 births
1989 deaths
People from Corleone
Italian film directors
Giallo film directors
Spaghetti Western directors
Film people from Sicily